Desensitized is an album by the industrial metal band, Pitchshifter, released on Earache Records in 1993. A music video was made for the track "Triad" that featured the band playing in a white room. The same track was also featured in the 1994 science fiction/horror film Brainscan.

Critical reception
The Encyclopedia of Popular Music wrote that "the lyrics built on the themes of oppression and social injustice, while the use of samplers and sequencers offered an extra aural dimension." Metal Hammer'''s The Book of Metal'' wrote that "the rumbling bass lines and jarring Prong-esque guitars filled dancefloors in alternative clubs across Europe."

Track listing

Personnel

Pitchshifter
 J.A. Carter – guitars, programming
 M.D. Clayden – bass
 'D'.J. Walters – drums
 J.S. Clayden – vocals

Technical personnel
 Paul Johnston – production, engineering
 Omni-Design – cover design
 Matt Anchor – band photo

References

Pitchshifter albums
1993 albums
Earache Records albums